Kevin Birr (born December 6, 1969, in Mankato, Minnesota, United States) is an American curler.

Teams

Men's

Mixed

Private life
Kevin Birr resides in St. Peter, Minnesota. He works as Catering manager at Gustavus Adolphus College.

He graduate Minnesota State University, Mankato.

His older brother Todd is a curler too, they played together many years.

He started curling in 1984, when he was 15 years old.

References

External links
 

Living people
1969 births
Sportspeople from Mankato, Minnesota
American male curlers
American curling champions
Continental Cup of Curling participants
Minnesota State University, Mankato alumni
People from St. Peter, Minnesota